Greenville High School, also known as Greenville Weston High School, is a public high school in Greenville, Mississippi, United States. It is a part of the Greenville Public School District.

History
In 2013, a $5 million construction project was begun to renovate the school's gymnasium and build 14 new classrooms.

Demographics
African Americans make up 99 percent of its 1,697 students. During the 2011–12 school year, 85 percent of students qualified for government-paid free lunch; another two percent qualified for government lunch subsidies, making Greenville Weston the state's school with the most students on lunch assistance.

Academics
Greenville Weston High School received failing grades from state examiners for the three years ending in 2013, making the school eligible for takeover by the state under a 2010 law. A takeover could involve the replacement of the entire faculty with new hires, but it is considered unlikely in the near future because Mississippi acknowledges that there are too many schools eligible for takeover than it could manage at one time.

Extracurricular activities
The Greenville Weston marching band is considered one of the best in the state. Its athletic teams are nicknamed the Hornets and the Lady Bees for girls' sports.

Notable alumni 
 Shelby Foote
 Walker Percy

References

External links
 Greenville High School

Greenville, Mississippi
Public high schools in Mississippi
Schools in Washington County, Mississippi